The Heart O' Texas Fair Complex, now known as the Extraco Events Center, is located in Waco, Texas.  It was once the prime basketball facility for Baylor University.  The H.O.T Coliseum was constructed after McLennan County voters authorized a bond issue of $1.2 million in the early 1950s.  Despite public criticism that might be directed toward the board and individual members, it was the board's unanimous decision to build portions of the entire plant that the available money would permit.  The last of five contracts was signed on January 9, 1952, and construction of the Coliseum began soon afterward.   The Coliseum, livestock  barn, ticket booths and several small buildings were constructed, paving was done and fencing enclosed the grounds.  In the spring of 1953, the Coliseum was completed, and on April 11, the formal opening was held.  The Coliseum remained home to Bears basketball, and Waco's largest concert venue, until Ferrell Center was built in 1988.

All facilities and grounds of the Fair Complex underwent renovations and/or reconstruction throughout the years of 2000 to 2005. Its facilities consist of the Heart O’ Texas Coliseum, Back Porch Club, Show Pavilion, General Exhibits Building, Creative Arts Building and the recently constructed Stall Barn. The Events Center coliseum seats 6,000 for rodeos and up to 9,000 for concerts.

In August 2010, officials announced that Extraco Banks signed a long-term naming rights deal, officially changing the name of the grounds to the Extraco Events Center.

The Heart O' Texas Fair & Rodeo, held for a week in October, is its largest attraction of the year, hosting a PRCA rodeo and accompanying fair, which attract hundreds of thousands.

The Extraco Events Center also hosts yearly events such as the Ringling Brothers and Barnum and Bailey circus, Monster Trucks, major concert acts, and has also hosted WWE Monday Night Raw on several occasions.

References

External links
 Extraco Events Center homepage 

Indoor ice hockey venues in the United States
Sports venues in Waco, Texas
Defunct college basketball venues in the United States
Baylor Bears basketball venues
Rodeo venues in the United States
Indoor arenas in Texas
Sports venues completed in 1953
1953 establishments in Texas